Volvatellidae is a taxonomic family of sea snails, marine gastropod mollusks in the superfamily Oxynooidea.

This family has no subfamilies.

Genera
There are two genera in the family Volvatellidae:
 Ascobulla Marcus, 1972
 Volvatella Pease, 1860

References